Johannes Kaiv (8 July 1897 – 21 November 1965) was an Estonian diplomat. A graduate in law from the University of Tartu, Kaiv studied at The Hague Academy of International Law. Between 1935 and 1939 he was the Honorary Consul in Sydney, Australia. In the years 1939 to 1965, he served the Estonian government-in-exile as the acting Consul General of Estonia in New York City, since 1940 in charge of Legation. In 1965 Ernst Jaakson succeeded him.

A veteran of the Estonian War of Independence, Kaiv was awarded the Military Order of the Cross of the Eagle, 3rd Class, in 1935.

On 21 November 1965, Kaiv died following a heart attack and was buried in the Kensico Cemetery in New York. His wife, Salme (1914–1999), was later buried beside him.

References

1897 births
1965 deaths
Estonian diplomats
Ambassadors of Estonia to the United States
Baltic diplomatic missions
The Hague Academy of International Law people
University of Tartu alumni
Estonian military personnel of the Estonian War of Independence
Recipients of the Military Order of the Cross of the Eagle, Class III
Burials at Kensico Cemetery